Dichomeris bilobella, the bilobed dichomeris moth, is a moth in the family Gelechiidae. It was described by Philipp Christoph Zeller in 1873. It is found in North America, where it has been recorded from Nova Scotia, southern Quebec and southern Ontario to Maryland, Minnesota, Missouri and eastern Kansas.

The forewings are dark grey to blackish, with a large pale brownish-yellow patch from the base along costa, then crossing the wing to the inner margin in the postmedian area. The subterminal line consists of several pale dots. The hindwings are pale grey. Adults are on wing from May to August.

The larvae feed on the leaves of Solidago (including Solidago flexicaulis) and Aster species.

References

Moths described in 1873
Taxa named by Philipp Christoph Zeller
bilobella